Magallanes is a Chilean football club based in San Bernardo, Chile. They will play in the Primera División de Chile starting from 2023 after winning the 2022 Primera B championship.

The club was founded on October 27, 1897 with the name Atlético Escuela Normal F.C.. In 1933 they became the first national champions of Chile. They won a hat trick of titles in the formative years of Chilean football (1933, 1934 and 1935) but their last major title came in 1938. In 2022 they won the Primera B championship and promotion to the top tier having not competed since 1986, they also won the Copa Chile for the first time in the same year which meant they qualified for the 2023 Copa Libertadores.

Magallanes, adopting their official name in 1904, is one of the oldest clubs in the country. Since the year 2000, after accepting the regulations of the Chilean law 20019, the team has been managed by a limited sports company. It is one of the eight founding clubs of the Nation Chilean Football League, the first football league established in the country, which also instituted the Premier Division (Primera Division) of Chile. In this league, Magallanes won their first championship in 1933. In addition, they were the first club to win three consecutive professional championships in Chile.

The club adopted white and sky blue as their official colors in 1908. These colors are used in their sportswear as well as their logo, which depicts a Caravel on the ocean. Since August 2015, Magallanes has practiced in their hometown of San Bernardo in the city stadium, which seats 3,500 spectators. They often compete in the Metropolitan Classic against their longtime rival, Santiago Morning. In addition, they have a rivalry against Colo-Colo, dubbed "Clásico de la Chilenidad".

Magallanes is ranked sixth for national titles in the Premier Division, tying Everton de Viña del Mar and Audax Italiano, with four each. They have been the runner up behind Colo-Colo, Universidad de Chile, Universidad Católica, Cobreloa and Unión Española. They also have one title from the Third Division (Tercera Division), one title from the Campeonato de Apertura, one from the Campeonato Relámpago and one from the Campeonato Absoluto. Despite their lack of titles in the last 70 years the club are still ranked as the seventh most successful team in the history of Chilean football.

Titles
Primera División: 4
1933, 1934, 1935, 1938

Copa Chile: 1
2022

Supercopa de Chile: 1
2023

Campeonato de Apertura (Cup): 1
1937

Primera B: 1
2022

Tercera División A: 2
1995, 2010

Performance in CONMEBOL competitions
Copa Libertadores: 1 appearance
1985: First Round

Current squad

2021 Winter Transfers

In

Out

Notable players
  Manuel Pichulman
  John Crawley

Managers
 Luis Tirado (1931)
 Máximo Garay (1942)
 Ferenc Plattkó (1944)
 Raúl Pino (1965)
 Ricardo Dabrowski (1993)
 Francisco Valdés (1997)
 Juan Páez (1998–1999)
 Osvaldo Hurtado (2008–2014)
 Pablo Abraham (2015–2016)
 Nicolás Núñez (2021-)

See also
Chilean football league system

References

External links
Magallanes Unofficial site 
Magallanes Official site 
Magallanes Supporter´s site 

Football clubs in Chile
Association football clubs established in 1897
Sport in Santiago
1897 establishments in Chile